The 1817 Pennsylvania gubernatorial election occurred on October 14, 1817. Incumbent Democratic-Republican governor Simon Snyder was not a candidate for re-election.  Simon's preferred successor, State Treasurer William Findlay, was nominated as the Democratic Republican candidate by a caucus of legislative leaders. Conversely, U.S. Representative Joseph Hiester was chosen as a candidate by the Democratic Republicans' first popular nominating convention; he additionally gained the endorsement of the declining Federalists. 

The two men ran starkly different campaigns. Findlay sought to continue aggressive policies of infrastructural investment and economic intervention while maintaining the patronage system for governmental employment. Hiester, a former Revolutionary War captain, called for a reduction in spending, an expansion in liberal economic policies, and an investigation into corruption in state government. Findlay was ultimately victorious by an approximately six point margin, as his dominance in the state's rural counties counteracted support for Hiester in the cities.

Results

References

1817
Pennsylvania
Gubernatorial
November 1817 events